Directorate General of Health Services is a Bangladesh government directorate under the Ministry of Health and Family Welfare responsible for health services in Bangladesh.

History
DGHS was established as directorate in 1978. It was upgraded to Directorate General in 1980.

On 23 January 2019, the Anti-Corruption Commission began investing 23 officers at Directorate General of Health Services for corruption and recommended their transfers.

Director General of Directorate General of Health Services Prof Abul Kalam Azad resigned on 22 July 2020 after Regent Hospital was raided for providing fake COVID-19 free certificates. The hospital was shut down by the Directorate General of Health Services on 8 July after a raid by Rapid Action Battalion. The Directorate General of Health Services and the Ministry of Health and Family Welfare traded blames over the Regent Hospital scandal. Directorate General of Health Services signed a memorandum of understanding with Regent Hospital in March 2020 and the signing ceremony was attended by Minister of Health and Family Welfare Zahid Maleque. Another organization issuing fake COVID-19 certificates was JKG Healthcare. Officials at Directorate General of Health Services requested JKG Healthcare to submit a proposal to collect COVID-19 samples for a scheme to siphon of from the 5 billion emergency COVID-19 fund. CEO of JKG Healthcare Ariful Chaudhury and his wife and chairperson of JKG, Sabrina Arif Chaudhury, were arrested by police for issuing fake COVID-19 certificates.

Abul Bashar Mohammed Khurshid Alam is appointed as director general on 23 July 2020. Alam criticised media coverage on the healthcare system and the Ministry of Health and Family Welfare. Anti-Corruption Commission arrested Abzal Hossain who worked for Institute of Health Technology of Directorate General of Health Services. The Commission found 2.84 billion taka in his and his wife's accounts. Khurshid Alam tested positive for COVID-19 in March 2021.

Directorate General of Health Services claimed in December 2020 that Bangladesh will receive 68 million vaccines for the COVID-19 pandemic in Bangladesh from GAVI under COVAX and additional 30 million from Serum Institute of India.

Malek scandal 
Malek started working as a driver in the Directorate General of Health Services in 1982. He came to prominence after Syed Modasser Ali became Director General of Directorate General of Health Services as his close aid. In 2009, he worked as the personal driver of Director General of Directorate General of Health Services Shah Monir Hossain. He lobbied for 100 assistant directors posts in Upazilas of Bangladesh. He made a few billion taka and provided a percentage to Shah Monir Hossain. Hossain was replaced by Khondokar Md Shefayetullah as Director General of Directorate General of Health Services. Shafeyetullah created a canteen for third and fourth class employees of the directorate which Malek turned into his personal office. Malek then worked as the personal driver of AHM Enayet Hossain, additional director general of Directorate General of Health Services. Enayet was made Director General of Directorate General of Medical Education and Malek was transferred he still continued to work for Enayet.

Malek maintained close relations with President of Bangladesh Medical Association Mustafa Jalal Mohiuddin. Malek was detained in September 2020 by Rapid Action Battalion. He was suspended by Directorate General of Health Services following his arrest. Their investigation revealed that he had accumulated around 10 billion taka. Malek was known as the shadow Director General of Directorate General of Health Services. He also used to maintain good relationship with Swadhinata Chikitshak Parishad.  Directorate General of Medical Education and AHM Enayet Hossain denied any involvement with Malek in an official statement. In February 2021, Anti-Corruption Commission sued Malek was sued for hiding information on his wealth and another case was filed against him and his wife for possessing wealth beyond their known source of income. In March 2021, Malek was charged with possessing illegal weapons and ammunitions by a tribunal in Dhaka.

Organogram
Office is led by the Director General (DG). He is assisted by two Additional Director Generals(ADG), directors, line directors, deputy directors, other officers & supporting staffs.

References

1971 establishments in Bangladesh
Organisations based in Dhaka
Government agencies of Bangladesh
Government departments of Bangladesh